Trinity, in comics, may refer to:

DC Comics comics and characters:
Trinity (comics character), a character created in 1990 and used in stories featuring the Teen Titans and Wonder Woman
Trinity (story arc), a 1993 crossover story arc that include a limited series and  issues of Green Lantern vol. 3, Darkstars, and L.E.G.I.O.N.
Batman/Superman/Wonder Woman: Trinity, a 2002 limited series by Matt Wagner
Trinity (comic book), a 2008 weekly limited series written by Kurt Busiek, with art by Mark Bagley
Blue Trinity and Red Trinity, Soviet superspeedster teams created by Pyotr Orloff, featured in Flash and Suicide Squad
Trinity (Team Tejas), an Azteca Productions superheroine and member of Team Tejas
Trinity Blood, a light novel series and manga
Trinity Angels, a 1997 series from Acclaim Comics
Broken Trinity, a 2008 series from Image Comics
Sister Trinity, a late nineteenth century, Old West avatar of Warrior Nun Areala

See also
Trinity (disambiguation)

References